NGC 6850 is a barred lenticular galaxy in the constellation Telescopium, discovered by John Herschel in 1836.

References

External links
SIMBAD info page
VIZIER info page

Astronomical objects discovered in 1836
6850
Barred lenticular galaxies
Telescopium (constellation)